The 2021 Cork Premier Intermediate Hurling Championship was the 18th staging of the Cork Premier Intermediate Hurling Championship since its establishment by the Cork County Board in 2004. The draw for the group stage placings took place on 29 April 2021. The championship began on 11 September 2021 and ended on 27 November 2021.

The final was played on 27 November 2021 at Páirc Uí Chaoimh in Cork, between Courcey Rovers and Castlelyons, in what was their first ever meeting in a final. Courcey Rovers won the match by 1-19 to 1-18 to claim their second championship title overall and a first title since 2011.  

Watergrasshill's Shane O'Regan was the championship's top scorer with 2-41.

Team changes

To Championship

Relegated from the Cork Senior A Hurling Championship
 Kilworth

Promoted from the Cork Intermediate A Hurling Championship
 Éire Óg

From Championship

Promoted to the Cork Senior A Hurling Championship
 Blarney

Relegated to the Cork Intermediate A Hurling Championship
 Blackrock

Participating teams

The seedings were based on final group stage positions from the 2020 championship.

Results

Group A

Table

Fixtures and results

Group B

Table

Fixtures and results

Group C

Table

Fixtures and results

Knockout stage

Relegation playoff

Quarter-finals

Semi-finals

Final

Championship statistics

Top scorers

Overall

In a single game

References

External link

 Cork GAA website

Cork Premier Intermediate Hurling Championship
Cork Premier Intermediate Hurling Championship